The Grogol River (Kali Grogol) is a small river in the western part of the Special Capital Region of Jakarta, Indonesia. The lower portions of the original river have been channelized with levees built along its banks, but flooding remains a real concern. Illegal buildings built along its banks were removed in 2014, and fifty-eight village families were provided with replacement housing, but most of them could not be accommodated.

Course
The Grogol passes through Desa Sukadamai and Desa Kencana. After crossing the Jakarta Outer Ring Road (Jalan Tol Lingkar Luar Jakarta) it follows parallel to and just east of Route 12. At  there is an overflow channel that goes west to the Pasanggrahan River. The Grogol continues north through Senayan City and just west of Gelora Bung Karno Stadium. It serves as a drain for Palmerah Urban Village.

Hydrology
The average daily rainfall is 144 mm, with the peak flow rate at 290 m³ per second.

Geography
The river flows in the northwest area of Java with predominantly tropical rainforest climate (designated as Af in the Köppen–Geiger climate classification). The annual average temperature in the area is 27 °C. The warmest month is March, when the average temperature is around 30 °C, and the coldest is May, at 26 °C. The average annual rainfall is 3674 mm. The wettest month is December, with an average of 456 mm rainfall, and the driest is September, with 87 mm rainfall.

References

Rivers of Jakarta
Rivers of Indonesia